Maria Macovei (born 7 January 1960) is a Romanian sports shooter. She competed in the women's 25 metre pistol event at the 1984 Summer Olympics.

References

1960 births
Living people
Romanian female sport shooters
Olympic shooters of Romania
Shooters at the 1984 Summer Olympics
Place of birth missing (living people)